Surya Prakash is an Indian film director who has worked on Tamil and Telugu language films. He made his directorial debut with Manikkam (1996), before making the action films, Maayi (2000) and Diwan (2003).

Career
Surya Prakash began his career by directing Manikkam (1996) featuring Rajkiran, before working on the unreleased Pen Ondru Kanden featuring Prabhu in the lead role during 1998. He later returned to make two action films featuring Sarathkumar in the early 2000s, Maayi (2000) and Diwan (2003). He also worked on Bharata Simha Reddy (2002), a Telugu film, which fetched negative reviews.

Surya Prakash subsequently failed to garner offers to helm big-budget films and worked on the village centric romance film Varusanadu in the early 2010s. He revealed that the film was based on the real life romance of his cousin and the film featured newcomers Kumaran and Srushti Dange. The film is yet to have a theatrical release. In 2014, he also began work on Adhibar (2015), an action thriller, featuring Jeevan in the lead role.

Filmography

References

Living people
Telugu film directors
Tamil-language film directors
Year of birth missing (living people)
20th-century Indian film directors
21st-century Indian film directors